The 2006 Argentina rugby union tour of Europe was a series of matches played in November 2006 in England, France and Italy by Argentina national rugby union team. It was an Historical tour with the first victory against England on their "home" of Twickenham.

The Pumas won also against Italy and lose only a very well played match against France.

Results

References

Notes

2006 rugby union tours
tour
2006
2006–07 in European rugby union
2006–07 in English rugby union
2006–07 in Italian rugby union
2006–07 in French rugby union
2006
2006
2006